Gangrel may refer to:

Gangrel (magazine), a British literary magazine of the 1940s
Gangrel (wrestler) (born 1969), ring name for American professional wrestler David Heath
A fictional clan of vampires in the role-playing game Vampire: The Masquerade
The former king of the nation of Plegia in Fire Emblem Awakening.